David Iserson (born December 3, 1977) is an American novelist, screenwriter, television writer, and producer living in Los Angeles, CA. When he was twenty five, he was hired to write on the 2003-2004 season of Saturday Night Live. He has since written and produced episodes of Mr. Robot, Mad Men, New Girl, Up All Night, and United States of Tara. In 2014, his debut young adult fiction novel, Firecracker, was chosen as one of Rolling Stone's "40 Best YA Novels."

Background and career
Iserson attended Northwestern University, where he graduated with a degree in Communications from its Radio/Television/Film program.

Writing credits

Saturday Night Live (2003–2004)
United States of Tara (2009-2011)
Up All Night (2011-2012)
New Girl (2012-2014)
Mad Men (2014)
Mr. Robot (2015)
Angry Angel (2017)

Books
Razorbill, an imprint of Penguin Books USA, published Iserson's first YA novel, Firecracker in 2013.

Radio
In 2007, Iserson appeared on "The Spokesman" (Episode 338) of This American Life, discussing his teenage appearance in his father's local TV ad.

References

External links

1977 births
Living people
American television writers
American male television writers
Jewish American novelists
American male novelists
American male screenwriters
Northwestern University alumni
21st-century American Jews